The San Francisco Workers' School was an ideological training center of the Communist Party USA (CPUSA) established in San Francisco for adult education in 1934.  "It was a typical specimen of a Communist school, such as would come under investigation by federal and state authorities for decades afterward.". in the 1940, it emerged as the California Labor School.

History

In 1934, Anita Whitney, Samuel Adams Darcy, Benjamin Ellisberg, Lincoln Steffens, and Steffens' wife Ella Winter supported the establishment of the San Francisco Worker's School, housed at CPUSA headquarters at 121 Haight Street in San Francisco.

The school drew inspiration from the Jack London Memorial Institute (founded 1917).

Organization

Like similar workers' schools in New York and Chicago, it held classes at night (after normal work hours) and taught the basics of Communism.

Administrators

(forthcoming)

Advisory board

According to Tenney Committee report of 1947, the following people served on an advisory board for the school:
 Langston Hughes
 Lincoln Steffens
 Anita Whitney

Teachers

According to Stephen Schwartz, the following people taught at the school:
 Kenneth Rexroth - Art
 Samuel Adams Darcy - unknown
 Elaine Black - unknown
 Karl Hama (Party name for Goso Yoneda) - unknown
 Sam Goodwin - unknown
 Louise Todd Lambert - unknown

Courses
According to Stephen Schwartz, the following courses were taught at the school:
 Principles of Communism
 Marxian Economics
 National and Colonial Problems
 History of the Social and Communist Movements
 Self-Defense in Courts (4-session)
 Organizing the Working Class (only for CPUSA and YCL members)

Publications

The school published a journal called Writers' Workshop, edited by activist, novelist, historian Alexander Saxton.

Impact

(forthcoming)

Legacy

"The early San Francisco Workers School morphed into the Tom Mooney School, and then reappeared as CLS" (the California Labor School).

See also
 Rand School of Social Science (1906)
 Work People's College (1907)
 Brookwood Labor College (1921)
 New York Workers School (1923)
 New Workers School (1929)
 Jefferson School of Social Science (1944)
 Highlander Research and Education Center (formerly Highlander Folk School) (1932)
 Commonwealth College (Arkansas) (1923-1940) 
 Southern Appalachian Labor School (since 1977)
 California Labor School (formerly Tom Mooney Labor School) (1942)
 Seattle Labor School (1946–1949)
 Continuing education
 Los Angeles People's Education Center

Footnotes

Further reading

 

 

Educational institutions established in 1934
Labor schools
Socialism in the United States
Communism in the United States
Communist Party USA
1934 establishments in California
Education in San Francisco
Politics of San Francisco
1940s disestablishments in California